Andrew Kushnir (born 1980) is a Canadian playwright and actor. He is most noted as co-creator with Damien Atkins and Paul Dunn of The Gay Heritage Project, a theatrical show dramatizing aspects of LGBT history which was shortlisted for the Dora Mavor Moore Award for Outstanding New Play in 2014,

The artistic director of Project Humanity, a theatrical organization which uses the arts to raise social awareness, Kushnir specializes in verbatim theatre which addresses social issues by making theatrical presentations out of the real testimonies of people impacted by social issues. His plays have included Captain Princess, foto, The Middle Place, Small Axe, Wormwood and Towards Youth: A Play on Radical Hope.

He is currently playwright in residence at Tarragon Theatre.

References

1980 births
21st-century Canadian male actors
21st-century Canadian male writers
21st-century Canadian dramatists and playwrights
Canadian male stage actors
Canadian male dramatists and playwrights
Canadian LGBT dramatists and playwrights
Canadian gay actors
Canadian gay writers
Male actors from Montreal
Writers from Montreal
Living people
21st-century Canadian LGBT people
Gay dramatists and playwrights